The siege of Fort Wayne took place from 5–12 September 1812, during the War of 1812. The stand-off occurred in the modern city of Fort Wayne, Indiana, between the United States garrison at Fort Wayne and a combined force of Potawatomi and Miami, supported by British troops. The conflict began on 5 September, when warriors under Native American chiefs Winamac and Five Medals killed two members of the U.S. garrison. Over the next several days, the Native Americans burned the buildings and crops of the fort's adjacent village, and launched sporadic assaults from outside the fort. Winamac withdrew on 12 September, ahead of reinforcements led by Major General William Henry Harrison.

The attack on Fort Wayne was one of several attacks on U.S. outposts by Native Americans in September 1812. Other coordinated attacks occurred at Fort Harrison, Pigeon Roost, and Fort Madison.

Background

Fort Wayne was established in 1794 by United States forces under Major General Anthony Wayne. It was built at the end of the Northwest Indian War to exert United States influence at a large collection of Native American towns known as Kekionga. The 1809 Treaty of Fort Wayne, which granted approximately 30 million acres of Native American land to white settlers in the areas of Illinois and Indiana, was a major influence behind the Native American motivation to resist the United States' expansion. In addition, the 1811 Battle of Tippecanoe kept tensions high between native nations and U.S. settlers.

As a frontier outpost in a busy, Native American town located in remote northeastern Indiana Territory, this fort had fallen into disrepair in years leading up to 1812.

The garrison was often insubordinate, many of the buildings deteriorated and supplies dwindled under the leadership of Captain James Rhea. Rhea, who had previously commanded Fort Industry and served in Wayne's army, arrived in Fort Wayne and took command on May 15, 1810. Days after his arrival, Rhea wrote to Colonel Jacob Kingsbury: "I am much pleased with my Command; I hope to be continued here ... at this Post everything has been going on very correct; I mean to take the Tract of Capt. Heald as near as possible ... I have been very will with Rheumatism Pains ever since I left you. I don't know if I ever shall recover, I have not had a Night Sleep in two Weeks."

Rhea also soon took note of the fort's inhabitants' tendency for drunkenness, lamenting the behavior as an "abominable [sic] practice" and confiding that he was "Much hurt to see so much intoxication". As an almost ironic harbinger, Rhea, perhaps as a means of escape from his rheumatism, would eventually himself befall to the throws of alcohol, in a "striking reversal", as described by historian Charles Poinsatte, through "his decline from the position taken in his first garrison order...To that of a slave to alcohol in 1812", as would later be seen during the fort's siege. However, initially and for some time, Rhea proved to be an effective commander overseeing substantial repairs to the fort, in addition to the instituion of a sanitation program and furthered progress on land clearance.

The garrison first learned of the fall of Fort Dearborn on 26 August, when Corporal Walter Jordan returned after escaping the massacre. On 28 August, Stephen Johnston, a local trader, was killed approximately a mile from the fort. This news created disquiet in the garrison, and Indian agent John Johnston sent Shawnee Captain Logan to help evacuate the local women and children to the neighboring state of Ohio, 20 miles to the east.

In September 1812, warriors from the Potawatomi and Miami nations, led by Chiefs Winamac and Five Medals, gathered around Fort Wayne, garrisoned by approximately 70 soldiers and some civilians. Captain James Rhea sent letters to John Johnston and Ohio Governor Return Meigs to ask for assistance. On several occasions, Rhea invited Indian delegates into the fort to discuss peace terms. Historian Milo M. Quafie maintains news of the siege had been relayed “to Picqua, Ohio by Stephen Ruddle, whence his message was conveyed to Harrison".

Siege

Siege 
On 3 September, with an attack on the fort all but imminent, native chiefs including Winamac approached the fort holding a flag of truce. Explaining the fate for this fort made clear by the downfall of nearby forts Mackinaw, Detroit, and Chicago, Lieutenant Daniel Curtis replied to Winamac by inviting him into the fort, and the two drank three glasses of wine together. Lt. Curtis then rose from his seat and in a plea to Winamac stated: My good friend, I love you; I will fight for you; I will die by your side. You must save me!Lt. Curtis then gave Winamac a half-dollar as a sign of friendship and invited him for breakfast. Winamac would not attend this breakfast, but instead send a band of five warriors who would initiate the siege on the morning of 5 September 1812, after killing two soldiers returning from an outhouse. The Native Americans assaulted the fort from the east side and burned the homes of the surrounding village. The natives constructed two wooden cannons with the intention of convincing the US garrison that the British had arrived with artillery.

Captain Rhea, who was known to be a heavy drinker, was described in particular during this time as taking to drink while facing the native calamities. At the moment of the siege impending, Rhea was described as being:Drunk as a fool, and perfectly incapable of exercising rationality on any subject whatsoever, but was constantly abusing and ill treating everyone that came in his presence.The incompetence displayed by Rhea at this critical time, and the resulting disorder he created within the fort, was described by some of his colleagues as being the "greatest danger" of the siege and his officers considered placing him under arrest as a result. Rhea, drunken, and occasionally asserting the idea of surrender, would ultimately retreat to his quarters on the grounds that he was ill and be relieved. The fort's Indian Agent, Benjamin Stickney, took command of the fort with Lieutenants Daniel Curtis and Phillip Ostrander. Two assaults were made on the fort before the Native American force withdrew, awaiting a British force on the Maumee River that was bringing light artillery. That evening, Chief Winamac approached the fort with thirteen of his men to parley and was admitted. As the leaders talked, Winamac revealed a knife that he had hidden, and after a failed attempt on Stickney's life, Winamac was removed from the fort. Soon after, at approximately 20:00, the Native American forces resumed their assaults on the exterior of the fort. Winamac's forces tried to set the fort on fire, and while the garrison attempted to keep the walls wet, they returned fire with muskets and howitzers. The battle lasted approximately till 15:00 of 6 September, when the Native American forces retired to a safe distance from the fort. The fighting resumed at 21:00 that night.

Relief

Efforts were underway to reinforce Fort Wayne after news of the loss of Fort Michilimackinac, Fort Dearborn, and Fort Detroit reached Newport Barracks. General James Winchester was commander of the Northwestern Army, but Kentucky Governor Charles Scott had recently appointed Indiana Territory Governor William Henry Harrison as Major General of the Kentucky Militia and authorised him to relieve Fort Wayne, Harrison was at Newport Barracks to assume command of the militia. Harrison wrote a letter to Secretary of War William Eustis explaining the situation and apologising for taking unauthorised action, then quickly organised a militia force of 2,200 men and marched north to the fort. A small scouting party led by Fort Wayne settler William Oliver and Ohio Shawnee Captain Logan arrived at Fort Wayne during a lull in the fighting, eluding Winamac's army and entering the fort. They delivered the news that a relief effort was approaching, and again rode through Winamac's siege to report to Harrison that the fort remained under U.S. control.

Harrison also received a report that a force of 400 Native Americans and 140 British regulars under Tecumseh were marching towards Fort Wayne. Harrison raced to arrive at Fort Wayne before Tecumseh and the British. By 8 September, Harrison and his backup of 2,200 troops had reached the village of Simon Girty on the St. Marys River, and were joined by 800 men of the Ohio militia under Colonel Adams and Colonel Hawkins at Shane's Crossing.

On 11 September, Winamac attempted a final attack on Fort Wayne, proving unsuccessful. On 12 September, the attack was broken off, and Winamac's forces crossed the Maumee River and disappeared into the woods. Harrison's relief army arrived later that day, uncontested by Winamac's warriors. The Native American and British force retreated into Ohio and Michigan Territory.

After the British had successfully captured the city of Detroit, they had received the news that American Indians had surrounded an American Fort. General Isaac Brock learned that a temporary armistice had been made in the east, and ordered Colonel Henry Procter to cease support for the attack on Fort Wayne.

Aftermath
The siege of Fort Wayne prompted Harrison to order punitive expeditions against nearby Native American villages. He sent a detachment of the 17th Infantry Regiment and mounted rifles under Colonel Samuel Wells against the Potawatomi villages of Five Medals, and another detachment of two Kentucky regiments under Brigadier General John Payne against Miami villages at the forks of the Wabash. The punitive expeditions culminated in the Battle of the Mississinewa in December 1812. Influential Miami Chief Pacanne had remained neutral in this latest war, but following American retaliation for the Fort Dearborn Massacre, Pacanne openly aligned with the British.

The unsuccessful attempts to take Fort Harrison and Fort Wayne, as well as the reprisals by Harrison, caused many Native Americans to lose confidence. Many of them turned instead to the influential leadership of Tecumseh and joined his confederacy. No major Indian attacks occurred in the Indiana Territory for the rest of the war, but it was not until Tecumseh's defeat at the Battle of the Thames that the Native American pressure on United States settlers waned.

On 18 September 1812, while the detachments were away attacking villages, General Winchester arrived at Fort Wayne. Harrison relinquished command and later received orders from Secretary Eustis to regain control of Michigan Territory. Harrison's successes built his reputation, and he soon replaced Winchester as commander of the North West Army. He planned to use Fort Wayne as one staging ground in an attempt to retake Fort Detroit, leading to the Battle of Frenchtown four months later.

Three active battalions of the current 3rd Infantry (1-3 Infantry, 2-3 Infantry and 4-3 Infantry) continue the lineage of the old 1st Infantry Regiment, which had a detachment at Fort Wayne. Following the destruction of the Council house during the siege, the building was reconstructed on the same site in 1816.

See also

 List of battles fought in Indiana
 Indiana in the War of 1812

References

Sources

External links
 Indiana history
 

Fort Wayne
1812 in the United States
History of Fort Wayne, Indiana
Fort Wayne
Fort Wayne
Fort Wayne
William Henry Harrison
September 1812 events